Sebastian Gorzny and Alex Michelsen defeated Gabriel Debru and Paul Inchauspé in the final, 7–6(7–5), 6–3 to win the boys' doubles tennis title at the 2022 Wimbledon Championships.

Edas Butvilas and Alejandro Manzanera Pertusa were the reigning champions, but Manzanera Pertusa was no longer eligible to participate in junior tournaments. Butvilas partnered Mili Poljičak, but they retired in the quarterfinals.

Seeds

Draw

Finals

Top half

Bottom half

References

External links

Draws

Boys' Doubles
Wimbledon Championship by year – Boys' doubles